Catenopylidae is a family of radiolarians in the order Spumellaria.

References

External links

Radiolarian families